The IWCCW Television Championship was the short lived secondary championship of International World Class Championship Wrestling. The title existed for a little over a year before being abandoned by the promotion. The IWCCW Television title has the distinction of being the only IWCCW title that did not originate in its predecessor, the ICW, but was created after ICW and WCCW merged. The TV title was abandoned in 1993 when a number of wrestlers left IWCCW to form Century Wrestling Alliance. Because the championship is a professional wrestling championship, it is not won or lost competitively but instead by the decision of the bookers of a wrestling promotion. The championship is awarded after the chosen team "wins" a match to maintain the illusion that professional wrestling is a competitive sport.

Title history

Footnotes

References

International World Class Championship Wrestling championships
Television wrestling championships